Allan Stephen Kennedy (born January 8, 1958) is a former American football player. He played offensive tackle for the San Francisco 49ers.

He grew up in Woodland Hills, California, where he attended El Camino Real High School. He then attended Washington State University to play football. In the 1981 NFL draft he was the 267th pick overall by the Washington Redskins. He was cut by the Redskins, but was signed by the 49ers. That year, he played 3 games. However, he didn't play in 1982. The next year, he played in every game, and in 1984, he only missed one game.

External links
NFL Stats

1958 births
Living people
Canadian players of American football
San Francisco 49ers players
Sportspeople from Vancouver
People from Woodland Hills, Los Angeles
American football offensive linemen
Washington State Cougars football players
Canadian emigrants to the United States
El Camino Real High School alumni
Gridiron football people from British Columbia
Sportspeople from Los Angeles County, California
Players of American football from California